This article lists articles on Wikipedia that are related to Bangladesh, Bengal and Bangladesh/Bengali culture. This is so that those interested in the subject can monitor changes to the pages by clicking on Related changes in the sidebar.

General
 Media of Bangladesh
 The Concert for Bangladesh
 List of beaches in Bangladesh

Places

Historic places
 Bikrampur
 Mainamati
 Mosque city of Bagerhat
 Somapura Mahavihara
 Sonargaon
 Mahasthangarh
 Paharpur
 Tajhat Palace
 Sitakot Vihara

In Dhaka
 Old Dhaka
 Bailey Road, Dhaka
 Kallyanpur
 Motijheel
 Nilkhet
 Ramna Park
 Suhrawardy Udyan
 Uttara (Town)
 Gulshan Thana
 Shahbag
 Azimpur
 Dhanmondi 
 Mirpur Thana
 Shewrapara
 Shantinagar, Dhaka

Other locations
 Districts of Bangladesh
 Upazilas of Bangladesh
Unions of Bangladesh
 Ashulia
 Benapole
 Gomostapur
 Bhaluka Upazila
 Chhagalnaiya Upazila
 Chhatak
 Dohogram
 Faridpur Sadar
 Fatullah
 Grand Trunk Road
 Homna Upazila
 Jat Area
 Khoksa
 Kumarkhali
 List of islands of Bangladesh
 Patenga
 Patiya Upazila
 Sandwip
 Savar Upazila
 Tajhat
 Teknaf Upazila
 St. Martin's Island
 Madhabkunda
 Sitakunda
 Chandpur

Politics

Government
 Coat of arms of Bangladesh
 East Bengal Legislative Assembly
 Jatiyo Sangshad

Laws
 Incorporated Council of Law Reporting

Gallantry
 Bir Sreshtho
 Bir Uttom
 Bir Bikrom
 Bir Protik

National
 Bangla Academy Award
 Ekushey Padak
 Independence Day Award
 National symbols of Bangladesh

Hospitals and Clinics

Hospitals

 Dhaka Medical College Hospital
 Mitford Hospital, Dhaka

Culture

 Architecture
 Baul
 Calendar
 Cinema
 Cuisine
 Language
 Literature
 Ghosts in Bengali culture
 Music
 Public holidays
 Sports
 Theatre
 TV and radio channels
 Weddings

Organizations

General
 Bangladesh Small and Cottage Industry Corporation

Transports
 Bangladesh Railway
 Bangladesh Road Transport Corporation
 Civil Aviation Authority of Bangladesh
 Transport and communication of Bangladesh

Telecommunication
 Bangladesh Telegraph and Telephone Board

Cultural organisations
 Bangla Academy
 Bangladesh Nazrul Sena
 Bishwa Sahitya Kendra
 Chhayanaut
 Shilpakala Academy
 Shishu Academy

Municipal corporations
 Chittagong City Corporation
 Dhaka City Corporation

Airlines
 Biman Bangladesh Airlines
 GMG Airlines
 United Airways

Organisations
 Bangladesh Computer Society
 Bangladesh Society of Microbiologists
 Bangladesh Cartoonist Association

NGO
 Acid Survivors Foundation
 ASA
 BRAC
 Blind Education and Rehabilitation Development Organisation
 Christian Commission for Development in Bangladesh
 Grameen Bank

Publishing
 Agamee Prakashani
 Muktadhara
 Sheba Prokashoni

Business
 Adamjee Jute Mills
 Beximco
 Chittagong Stock Exchange
 Dhaka Stock Exchange
 Khulna Shipyard
 Pharmaceutical industry in Bangladesh
 Bangladesh Bureau of Statistics
 Bangladesh Export Processing Zone Authority
 FBCCI
 Transcom Group
 Bangladesh Jiban Bima Corporation
 Grameen Bank
 Rahimafrooz
 List of companies of Bangladesh
 Grameen family of organizations
 Eskayef Bangladesh Limited
 Credit Rating Agency of Bangladesh Limited  
 List of shopping malls in Bangladesh
 Navana Group
 Zaman Group of Industries
 Impress Telefilm Ltd

Events 
 Bhawal case